Hundvåg may refer to:

Places
Hundvåg, Stavanger, a borough in the city of Stavanger in Rogaland county, Norway
Hundvåg (island), an island in the city of Stavanger in Rogaland county, Norway
Hundvåg Church, a church in the city of Stavanger in Rogaland county, Norway
Hundvåg Tunnel, a subsea tunnel in Rogaland county, Norway

Other
Hundvåg FK, an association football club in the borough in the city of Stavanger in Rogaland county, Norway